The Oklahoma CareerTech Hall of Fame is an award given to individuals who, through their outstanding professional and personal achievements, have brought honor and distinction to career and technology education in Oklahoma.

The Oklahoma CareerTech Hall of Fame is sponsored by the Oklahoma Foundation for Career and Technology Education.  The first members were inducted in 1990; beginning in 1991 the awards were presented biennially in odd-numbered years.

Members
2017
Dr. Belinda Cole, former associate state director for career and support services of career and technology education
Dr. Fern Green-Bowling, retired equity coordinator of career and technology education
Dr. James Strate, retired superintendent of Autry Technology Center and former deputy superintendent of Great Plains Area Vocational and Technical School (now Great Plains Technology Center)
Tom Thomas, retired superintendent of Great Plains Technology Center
Joan Welborn, former owner, CEO and president of ADPC, a software development services company in Ponca City

2015
Phil Berkenbile, former state director, ODCTE
Dean Denton, former business and information technology instructor, Broken Arrow High School 
Dale DeWitt, former member of the Oklahoma House of Representatives (District 38) and Agricultural Education Instructor, Braman High School
Bea Paul, former Job Developer, Autry Technology Center and Family and Consumer Science Instructor, Chisholm High School, Enid
Greg Pierce, former superintendent, Pontotoc Technology Center
 
2013
Harold Anglin, former superintendent and state board member
Frank Coulter, former superintendent of Moore Norman Technology Center
Norman Filtz, retired, ODCTE
Dr. Kay Martin, former superintendent of Francis Tuttle Technology Center
Dwight Stoddard, retired, ODCTE

2011
Henry Bellmon, former Governor of Oklahoma and U.S. senator
Earl Cowan, former superintendent of Canadian Valley Technology Center
Jim E. Hamilton, former state senator and representative
Vince Orza, Ph.D., president and CEO of KSBI, Oklahoma City

2009

Dick Anderson, Retired Executive Vice President AGC of Oklahoma
Brenda Brixey, Retired Family and Consumer Sciences Teacher
Dr. Gene Callahan, Retired Tulsa Technology Center Superintendent
Raymond Cockrum, Retired agricultural education District Supervisor, ODCTE 
Clovis Weatherford, Retired Tri County Technology Center Superintendent 

2007
Charlotte Edwards, Retired Executive Director of Oklahoma ACTE
Senator Ted V. Fisher, former Oklahoma Senate 
Mike Stephens, agricultural education teacher and FFA adviser 
Ron Wilkerson, Retired chief communications officer at ODCTE
Elmer L. “Tex” Williamson, Retired student services specialist

2005

RL Beaty, Retired Chief of Staff, ODCTE
Ann Benson, Retired Director, ODCTE
Sam Combs, co-founder the Retired Educators for Agriculture Programs (REAP) 
Chuck Hopkins, Retired assistant director, ODCTE 
Frosty Troy, Editor of The Oklahoma Observer

2003
Arthur Foster, former community banker  
Dr. Clyde Knight, former trade and industrial education professor at Oklahoma State
DeAnn Pence, Retired vocational Family and Consumer Sciences instructor
Dr. J.W. Weatherford, former professor of vocational teacher education at UCO

2001
Gus Friedemann, Retired Distributive Education instructor, Stillwater High School
Ruth Killough, Retired LPN instructor, Mid-Del Technology Center
Roy Peters, Jr, former State Director, ODCTE 
Bill Powers, Retired Superintendent, Kiamichi Technology Center
Jean Robertson, Retired Family and Consumer Sciences Instructor, Pryor Junior High
Wes Watkins, retired member of the United States House of Representatives, namesake of Wes Watkins Technology Center

1999
Vic Van Hook, Retired Deputy Director, ODCTE 
John Hopper, Retired Superintendent, Central Technology Center
Dale Hughey, Retired, ODCTE 
Dr. Joe Lemley, Retired Superintendent, Tulsa Technology Center
Wayne Miller , Retired Director, Oklahoma State University-Okmulgee
Marvin Stokes, Retired Superintendent, Byng Public Schools

1997
Dr. Roy Ayres, former State Supervisor, Trade and Industrial Education
Ted Best , former state adviser, DECA
Dr Bob Brown, Retired professor, Central State University
Dr Willa Combs, Retired professor and chair, Langston University 
Dr Coaken Jones, former National New Farmers of America Adviser
Ernest Muncrief, Retired agricultural education instructor, Marlow, Oklahoma

1995
Edna Crow, retired district supervisor, Family and Consumer Sciences
Jess Banks, retired state coordinator of the Employment and Training Division, ODCTE
Bruce Gray, Superintendent, Francis Tuttle Technology Center
Ralph Dressen, Retired agricultural education District Supervisor, ODCTE 
Hugh Lacy, former coordinator of Manpower Division, ODCTE 
Mary Randall, retired coordinator, Health Occupations, ODCTE

1993
Larry Hansen, retired assistant director, ODCTE 
Bill Harrison, retired director, Oklahoma ACTE
Don Ramsey, owner, Blue and Gold Sausage Company
May Rollow, retired state supervisor, Family and Consumer Sciences

1991
Dr. Arch Alexander, deputy director of the Oklahoma Department of Career and Technology Education
MJ DE Benning, former distributive education state supervisor, assistant professor at Oklahoma State University
Dick Fisher, chartered Cushing FFA Chapter
Dr. Lucille Patton, dean of the Special College of Arts and Sciences, Central State University

1990
Dewey Bartlett, former Governor of Oklahoma, instrumental in creation of CareerTech system
Otha Grimes, Polled Hereford industry
Caroline Hughes, appointed to National Advisory Council on Vocational Education
Byrle Killian, Regent, OSU and A&M Colleges, former state supervisor Agriculture Education
George Nigh, former Governor of Oklahoma
J.B. Perky, former director, ODCTE
Robert Price, dean, Department of Agriculture Education, Oklahoma State University
Roy P. Stewart, author of the Country Boy Column in The Daily Oklahoman, colonel in Oklahoma National Guard
Lela O’Toole, former dean College of Home Economics, Oklahoma State University
Francis Tuttle, former Oklahoma Department of Career and Technology Education ODCTE State Director, namesake of Francis Tuttle Technology Center

See also
Oklahoma Department of Career and Technology Education

References

External links
Oklahoma Department of Career and Technology Education
Oklahoma CareerTech Foundation

Government of Oklahoma
Vocational education in Oklahoma
Education in Oklahoma
Halls of fame in Oklahoma
State halls of fame in the United States
Vocational education in the United States